The episodes of the Tegami Bachi anime are an adaptation of the manga series by creator Hiroyuki Asada, currently serialized on the Japanese monthly Jump SQ. magazine. The story is about a boy named Lag Seeing, who is a "Letter Bee", a delivery boy at the "Bee Hive" which fulfills everyone's delivery requests. Lag's "Dingo", or personal bodyguard, keeps him out of danger from the Gaichuu, giant insects that roam the darkness and attacks anyone near them. The series explores Lag's adventures as he helps deliver packages for the inhabitants of AmberGround. The animation will be handled by Pierrot+, while the cast that voiced some of the characters featured in the Tegami Bachi special  will return for the regular anime.

The series premiered on TV Tokyo, TV Osaka, TV Aichi and their affiliated stations on October 3, 2009. A total of seven DVDs were released in January 2010 by Bandai Visual. The episodes have currently four pieces of theme music, two opening themes and two ending themes. The first opening theme  is sung by Suga Shikao featuring Japanese hip-hop DJ Mummy-D which appears in the first 13 episodes, while  is sung by Seira, which serves as the second opening theme for episodes 14 onwards. The first ending theme  is sung by HIMEKA which appear in the first 13 episodes, while  is sung by Japanese rock band Angelo, which serves as the second ending theme from episode 14 onwards.


Season 1

Tegami Bachi Academy
A series of three-minute original anime shorts will be included in each Japanese Region 2 DVD of Tegami Bachi. Titled , the omake series focuses on the background settings of the world of Amberground not touched upon or elaborated much in the anime, and provides a hilarious class setting with chibi versions of the characters.

Season 2: Tegami Bachi REVERSE
A 2nd season named  was announced right after the final episode of the first series. A promotional movie was shown on the official anime's website. The second season premiered on TV Tokyo, TV Osaka, TV Aichi and their affiliated stations on October 2, 2010.

The series has four pieces of theme music. The first opening theme,  is sung by Stereopony, while the first ending theme  is sung by Piko. The second opening theme  is sung by Suga Shikao, while the second ending theme  is sung by Yamazaru.

References
General
 

Specific

External links
Official Tegami Bachi anime website 

Tegami Bachi